Samuel and Johanna Jones Farm is a historic home and farm complex located near Amsterdam in Montgomery County, New York.  The farmhouse was built about 1840 and is in the Greek Revival style.  It consists of a 2-story main block, three bays wide and three bays deep, with a 2-story rear wing.  Attached is a -story "tee" wing, with a 1-story wing.  It features an oriel window, covered wooden balconies, and porches.  Also on the property are a cowbarn, milkshed, a chicken coop, a machine shed, and an outhouse.

It was added to the National Register of Historic Places in 1993.

References

Farms on the National Register of Historic Places in New York (state)
Houses completed in 1840
Houses in Montgomery County, New York
National Register of Historic Places in Montgomery County, New York